Michael Schenker is a German hard rock and heavy metal guitarist who began his career as the lead guitarist in Scorpions and UFO. Since his second departure from Scorpions in 1979, he has primarily focused on his own eponymous bands, namely the Michael Schenker Group (from 1979 to 1984, 1996 to 2011, and since 2020), the McAuley Schenker Group (from 1986 to 1993), Michael Schenker's Temple of Rock (from 2011 to 2016) and Michael Schenker Fest (from 2016 to 2020). The current members of his solo band are vocalist Ronnie Romero, rhythm guitarist and keyboardist Steve Mann, bassist Barend Courbois, and drummer Bodo Schopf.

History

1979–1984: Michael Schenker Group
A few months after his second departure from Scorpions in April 1979, guitarist Michael Schenker formed the Michael Schenker Group with vocalist Gary Barden, bassist Billy Sheehan and drummer Denny Carmassi. The group rehearsed for around a month, producing a number of demo recordings, before the guitarist jammed with members of Aerosmith following the departure of lead guitarist Joe Perry. After hospitalising himself due to problems with drug addiction, Schenker reconvened with Barden in May 1980 to record the band's self-titled debut album, which featured session contributors Mo Foster on bass, Simon Phillips on drums and Don Airey on keyboards. For the subsequent touring cycle, Schenker enlisted bassist Chris Glen, drummer Cozy Powell and keyboardist Paul Raymond.

The group's lineup remained intact for 1981's MSG, but splintered after the album's tour when Barden was fired by manager Peter Mensch. Former Rainbow frontman Graham Bonnet, who had worked with Powell in the past, was brought in the following February. By April, the drummer had left MSG as well. He was replaced by Ted McKenna, a former bandmate of Glen's in The Sensational Alex Harvey Band, who performed on Assault Attack. Prior to the album's release, Bonnet was sacked after drunkenly exposing himself on stage at a show in the UK, as well as revealing backstage rhythm guitarist Steve Casey to the crowd. The next day, he was immediately replaced by the returning Barden, who was brought in by Glen and McKenna in time for the band's performance at Reading Festival a few days later. Andy Nye had also taken over from the departed Raymond during this period, after session musician Tommy Eyre contributed keyboards to Assault Attack.

In August 1983, former Ted Nugent band member Derek St. Holmes joined MSG on rhythm guitar, although by the end of a tour in October he had left again. Former Argent guitarist John Verity filled in for the last dates of the run. Glen also left in February 1984 due to disagreements over royalty payments, with former Balance bassist Dennis Feldman taking his place. By April, Barden had also been fired for a second time, due to his increasing alcoholism. He was replaced later by Ray Kennedy, who left after the completion of the latest touring cycle in August. Before the end of the year, Aye and McKenna also left MSG, leaving Schenker to rebuild the group. However, he decided against recruiting new members and instead disbanded his eponymous group and returned to Germany.

1986–1993: McAuley Schenker Group
After disbanding the Michael Schenker Group in 1984, the eponymous guitarist claimed that he wanted "to experience a partnership ... someone to make decisions with", instead of a band centred solely around himself. In April 1986, he found this partner in former Grand Prix vocalist Robin McAuley, with whom he formed a new group. The pair recruited bassist Rocky Newton, drummer Bodo Schopf and keyboardist and rhythm guitarist Mitch Perry to record the group's debut album Perfect Timing, which was released the following year. Steve Mann preceded Perry on keyboards and rhythm guitar in the lineup, but left in mid-1987. During the recording of their debut album, Schenker renamed the band the McAuley Schenker Group, a decision with which McAuley disagreed on the basis of the original group's existing recognition. Perry remained for the Perfect Timing touring cycle into 1988.

Mann returned to the McAuley Schenker Group after the Perfect Timing tour, and the band released their sophomore album Save Yourself in 1989. The group took a break in 1990 as Schenker toured and recorded with supergroup Contraband, before returning in 1991 with M.S.G. featuring bassist Jeff Pilson, drummer James Kottak and keyboardist Jesse Harms. McAuley and Schenker remained the only official members of the group, however, and completed an acoustic tour in promotion of the release between November 1991 and March 1992. The tour featured rhythm guitarist Spencer Sercombe. The duo released Nightmare: The Acoustic M.S.G. and "Unplugged" Live in 1992, but by early the next year had disbanded as Schenker left the band, his record label and his management.

1996–2006: Second MSG tenure

After spending a second tenure in UFO, Schenker reformed the Michael Schenker Group in 1996 and released Written in the Sand, featuring new vocalist Leif Sundin, bassist Barry Sparks and drummer Shane Gaalaas. For the subsequent promotional tour, Seth Bernstein joined on rhythm guitar and keyboards. David VanLanding substituted for Sundin on the opening US leg of the tour, and remained for Japanese dates recorded for The Michael Schenker Story Live. The group took a break again as Schenker completed a third stint in UFO, before returning in early 1998 to join the G3 tour with a lineup of Barden, VanLanding, Gaalaas, Bernstein and bassist Jeff Kollman. Gaalaas and Bernstein remained for the 1999 album The Unforgiven, which featured vocalist Kelly Keeling and bassist John Onder.

For the tour in support of The Unforgiven, Sparks returned on bass, Keith Slack joined as a second vocalist, and Wayne Findlay replaced Bernstein. After the end of the tour in 2000, Schenker returned to UFO for a fourth time. During the year, he also worked on three solo albums. By the time MSG returned in early 2001, the group featured an entirely new lineup of vocalist Chris Logan, bassist Rev Jones and drummer Jeff Martin. After the recording of Be Aware of Scorpions, Martin left the band due to problems stemming from Schenker's drinking problem. He was replaced by Jeremy Colson, who was unveiled in November. The group remained largely inactive during 2002, as Schenker recorded Sharks with UFO, and released the second and third volumes of his Thank You series. The guitarist was also due to take part in Uli Jon Roth's Legends of Rock tour in Europe at the end of the year, but was forced to pull out after dislocating his shoulder.

In April 2003, MSG announced a new lineup including Logan, Colson and bassist Stuart Hamm, who recorded the album Arachnophobiac. For the subsequent tour, Schenker and Logan were joined by the returning Findlay and Jones, plus new drummer Pete Holmes. Logan remained until November 2004, when he left the band after being injured in a fight with Jones. He was replaced by former frontman Leif Sundin. Early the next year, Schenker collaborated with Bob Kulick on Heavy Hitters, an album of cover versions featuring various guest musicians. Around the same time, both Jones and Holmes left MSG following "continuous cancelled tour dates and bad management decisions". Schenker and Findlay recorded MSG's 25th anniversary album Tales of Rock'n'Roll with new vocalist Jari Tiura, UFO bassist Pete Way and former drummer Jeff Martin; all former frontmen of the group – including Barden, Bonnet and McAuley – made guest appearances on the album. Jones and Holmes returned for 2006 tour dates.

2006–2011: Barden's third MSG stint
After several legs of touring in promotion of Tales of Rock'n'Roll, Schenker announced in September 2006 that MSG was "finished", blaming Tiura for refusing to continue touring. Despite this, the same lineup of the band returned for a run of shows in Japan and Thailand in November, although a number of shows were cancelled or postponed due to Schenker's ongoing "health issues". Jones later criticised Schenker as a "talentless guitar player", claiming that he and Tiura had left earlier in the year due to the guitarist's inability to pay them for touring duties, before they returned to complete the Asian dates. In January 2007, after Jones and Holmes had left, bassist Frank Rummler and drummer Bodo Schopf were announced as new members of MSG's touring lineup. The group toured for several months, but were forced to cancel several dates later in the year for various reasons, including health and operational issues. In December, Tiura was replaced by original MSG singer Gary Barden.

MSG's next album, 2008's In the Midst of Beauty, featured contributions from drummer Simon Phillips, keyboardist Don Airey (both of whom contributed to the band's debut album in 1980) and bassist Neil Murray. For the album's touring cycle, Schenker, Barden and Findlay were due to be joined by former MSG members Chris Glen on bass and Ted McKenna on drums. However, by the time the tour started in June, McKenna had been replaced by former AC/DC drummer Chris Slade. For a US tour starting in March 2009, Robbie Crane was set to replace Glen; however, the tour was later postponed until June, and the lineup changed to feature Rev Jones and Pete Holmes in place of Glen and Slade, respectively. For South American dates in July, Dean Guitars owner Elliott "Dean" Rubinson took over from Jones, while Slade returned in place of Holmes, for European dates in September, Glen and Holmes returned, and in December, Slade rejoined.

In January 2010, MSG completed a short Japanese tour to mark the band's 30th anniversary, enlisting In the Midst of Beauty contributors Neil Murray and Simon Phillips. Glen and Slade returned for European dates starting in May, with Holmes taking over on drums in July; later US dates featured Rubinson and drummer Carmine Appice, the former of whom was replaced by Jones in August. MSG performed at the NAMM Show in January 2011 with Robin McAuley on vocals and Rubinson returning on bass. For a South American tour the next month, David VanLanding returned as the group's frontman. In June, Schenker performed one show in the Netherlands with Barden, Findlay, Glen and Slade; and in August he performed three shows in Italy with Barden, Findlay, Rubinson and Holmes.

2011–2016: Schenker's Temple of Rock
In July 2011, Schenker released a solo album entitled Temple of Rock. The album featured a core lineup of producer Michael Voss on vocals, former UFO bassist Pete Way, former Scorpions drummer Herman Rarebell and recurring MSG member Wayne Findlay on keyboards; additional contributors included former MSG members Robin McAuley, Paul Raymond and Chris Glen, plus a range of guest musicians. Voss, Rarebell and Findlay remained for initial tour dates around the album's release, with Elliott "Dean" Rubinson brought in on bass. Schenker's new Temple of Rock (TOR) band returned in February 2012, with Findlay and Rubinson joined by vocalist Robin McAuley and drummer Pete Holmes. For a Japanese tour the following month, Voss and Rarebell rejoined the group, and by the time of the group's first European tour a couple of months later, the lineup had settled with vocalist Doogie White and bassist Francis Buchholz.

After another US tour with Rev Jones and Pete Holmes in late 2012, TOR returned in 2013 with the lineup of Schenker, White, Findlay, Buchholz and Rarebell, releasing the studio album Bridge the Gap late in the year. The first leg of the album's promotional tour saw Buchholz and Rarebell replaced again by Jones and Holmes, before the former Scorpions members returned for the rest of the group's tenure.

2016–2020: Michael Schenker Fest
In March 2016, it was announced that Schenker would tour with a group dubbed Michael Schenker Fest (MSF), featuring vocalists Gary Barden, Graham Bonnet and Doogie White, alongside former MASG guitarist and keyboardist Steve Mann, and former MSG rhythm section Chris Glen (bass) and Ted McKenna (drums). For their first show at Sweden Rock Festival that June, Leif Sundin was also included as a fourth vocalist. The group toured with three vocalists until early 2018, when Temple of Rock singer Doogie White was added. In January 2019, after the release of Resurrection and during the recording of follow-up Revelation, McKenna died during elective surgery. The album was later completed with stand-in Simon Phillips, before Bodo Schopf took over upon its release. The group continued touring until January 2020, with their final shows on the 70000 Tons of Metal cruise without White. McAuley was forced to pull out of the shows after contracting sepsis.

Since 2020: MSG with Ronnie Romero
After several months away, Schenker announced a new MSG album, Immortal, featuring a lineup of Rainbow frontman Ronnie Romero on vocals, Steve Mann on rhythm guitar, Barry Sparks on bass and Bodo Schopf on drums. In July 2021, Blind Guardian bassist Barend Courbois joined the MSG touring lineup.

Official members

Current band members

Former band members

Other contributors

Session musicians

Touring musicians

Unabridged members

Timeline

Recording timeline

Line-ups

References

External links
Michael Schenker official website

Schenker, Michael